Fabien Gay (born 13 January 1984) is a French politician. He is a member of the French Senate representing Seine-Saint-Denis.

References

1984 births
Living people
French Communist Party politicians
Politicians from Île-de-France
Politicians from Bordeaux
French Senators of the Fifth Republic
Bordeaux Montaigne University alumni